Blackstone-State Theater is a historic theatre building located at South Bend, St. Joseph County, Indiana. It was built in 1919, and is a four-story, Classical Revival style brick and terra cotta building.  The first floor has four storefronts and the theatre entrance.  The upper floors form a loggia that rises to the fourth floor and supported by four pairs of fluted columns. The theater originally sat 2,500 patrons.

The theater was closed between 1977 and 1994, and it closed again in 2016.

It was listed on the National Register of Historic Places in 1985.

References

External links

State Theater website

Theatres on the National Register of Historic Places in Indiana
Neoclassical architecture in Indiana
Theatres completed in 1919
Buildings and structures in South Bend, Indiana
National Register of Historic Places in St. Joseph County, Indiana